(born 24 November 1969) is a Japanese actor from Kanagawa Prefecture. He is best known for his portrayal of Yuuji Mita/OHBlue in Chōriki Sentai Ohranger. In 2009, he joined the cast of Samurai Sentai Shinkenger in the recurring role of Shiba Retsudō, the first Shinken Red.

Filmography

Television
Chouriki Sentai Ohranger (1995–96), Yuji Mita/OhBlue
Doremisora (2002)
Mito Kōmon (2003–10), Kaku-san
Bewitched in Tokyo (2004), Kaku-san
AIBOU (2012), Hijikata

Films
Samurai Sentai Shinkenger the Movie: The Fateful War (2009), Shiba Retsudō
Ninomiya Kinjirō (2018), Ninomiya Kinjirō

References

External links
Official website
 

1969 births
Living people
Male actors from Kanagawa Prefecture
Stardust Promotion artists